F.C. Pedras Rubras is a Portuguese football club from the town of Pedras Rubras, a parish of Maia, in the region of Greater Porto.

Brief history
Founded in 1942, the club is seen as a good formation center, and eventually signed protocols with Leixões S.C. and topflight club F.C. Porto. Normally a mid-table club in the country's third division, it dropped down a level in 2005–06.

After a very good year in the following campaign, albeit without promotion, Pederas Rubras were again relegated in 2007–08, to the Portuguese District Football Associations.

Current squad

Famous players
Grégory Arnolin
Jorge Madureira
Hernâni
João Peixe
Marin
Jorge Vilaça
Weslem
Zé Carlos

External links
Zerozero team profile

Football clubs in Portugal
Association football clubs established in 1942
1942 establishments in Portugal